François Duhamel (born 20 November 1984 in Auchel) is a French professional footballer, who currently plays for Vendée Fontenay Foot.

Career
Duhamel played on the professional level in Ligue 2 for LB Châteauroux and in the Championnat National for AS Moulins.

External links
 

1984 births
Living people
French footballers
Ligue 2 players
LB Châteauroux players
AS Beauvais Oise players
AS Moulins players
SO Châtellerault players
USJA Carquefou players
Vendée Fontenay Foot players
Association football midfielders